Olszyc can refer to following locations in Poland:

 Olszyc-Folwark
 Olszyc Szlachecki
 Olszyc Włościański